The Musiques de Rues Festival is a festival of street music taking place in the city of Besançon, France, over four days around the first weekend of October.

It was created in 2006 and is dedicated to various forms of street music such as brass bands, fanfares, world music, hip-hop block party, sound installations and machines... The first edition, held in 2006, welcomed in the streets, squares and parks of the city about 70,000 members of the audience who could see a multitude of music performances for free, and about 800 musicians.

The Bollywood Brass Band (UK), Dee Nasty (France), Jaïpur Kawa Brass Band (India), and Hot 8 Brass Band (New Orleans) are some of the artists who performed during the 2006 session.

Pictures of the 2006 edition 

Music festivals in France
Tourist attractions in Besançon
Tourist attractions in Doubs